Giulio Aldinucci (born in 1981 in Siena) is an Italian composer. He has been active for years in the field of experimental electroacoustic music and in the research on soundscape. 

He composed eight albums released by the labels Karlrecords (D), 99chants (D), Home Normal (UK/J), Time Released Sound (USA), Dronarivm (RUS) and Nomadic Kids Republic (UK/J). Furthermore, he made six EPs and seven collaborative albums with Enrico Coniglio, The Star Pillow, Ian Hawgood, Francis M. Gri, Francesco Giannico and Pleq published by Midira (D), Home Normal (UK/J), KrysaliSound (I), Dronarivm (RUS) and Eilean (F).

In addition to his contribution to various collective works, he wrote music for theatre, video art and cinema. His music is featured in many compilations, including Sound at Work – electronic music and labour created by Tempo Reale, the Italian electronic music research centre founded by Luciano Berio, and the special edition of The Wire Tapper that celebrates the 50th issue with a selection from the series' 20 year back catalogue, among others.

Biography

Giulio Aldinucci was born in Siena (Italy) in 1981, he began composing in his teenage years. Aldinucci has a musical and an academic linguistics background. In 2001 he started the project Obsil (the word Obsil stands for "observing silence"): under this name, he released three albums between 2006 and 2011.
His first album, Tarsia, was released in August 2012 by the Anglo-Japanese label Nomadic Kids Republic (Home Normal sister label). 

In June 2013, taking their cue from Gianmarco Del Re’s column on Fluid Radio, which profiles the most interesting sound artists and musicians currently operating within the Italian electroacoustic scene, Giulio Aldinucci and Attilio Novellino translated the Postcards from Italy project into an album published on CD by Oak Editions, a live event at Cafe Oto (London) and a special installation at SoundFjord Gallery (London) by AIPS collective & Gianmarco Del Re. The Italian presentation of the Postcards From Italy project took place at Spazio O' in Milan on 1 February 2014. The Postcards from Italy album was included on the 2013 "Top Ten Field Recording & Soundscape" by A Closer Listen.

His third album, Spazio Sacro (“Sacred Space” in English), was released in 2015 by the North American label Time Released Sound released.
The seven tracks that compose Spazio Sacro are characterized by field recordings taken in places that are related to the idea of “sacred” in different ways. The starting point is a reflection on how human rites define new soundscapes (e.g. processions, architecture of churches and cathedrals or ruins of isolated mountain sanctuaries). The audio material has been manipulated and the music has been written in a constant dialogue with the artist's personal memories, especially those from childhood, when in his area (a small village in Tuscany, Italy) religious rites still marked the pace of the community life throughout the year.

His fifth album Borders and Ruins was released by Karlrecords in 2017. The album is a reflection on the instability of borders - borders as an extreme attempt to discriminate and rationalize that turns into a source of chaos and cultural ruins on both sides - and their impact on the relationship between people and territory. It is also a sonic diary focused on the relationship between people and the territory.

His composition Mute Sirens was awarded with an honourable mention at the 18th International Electroacoustic Composition Competition Música Viva 2017.

His sixth album Disappearing in a Mirror was released by Karlrecords in 2018 on vinyl and cd. This work shows a peculiar approach on ambient drone music. Where its predecessor Borders and Ruins was a reflection on the instability of borders, Disappearing in a Mirror raises the very personal question of identity. The album focuses on the fluidity of the identity concept, highlighting the harmonious coexistence of contradictory elements and the transitional features that characterize every transformation. It is a reflection on the current situation of change and disruption and at the same time it is a gaze into the human timeless soul and its inner soundscapes.

His eighth album Shards of Distant Times was released by Karlrecords in 2020 on vinyl and cd. As Shards of Distant Times is the third album Giulio Aldinucci has recorded for Karlrecords, one might consider the set a triptych. Borders and Ruins was an incredibly timely work, appearing in the early days of Brexit and Trump’s wall, while 2018’s Disappearing in a Mirror examined the more inner borders between “the self and the world.” Shards of Distant Times looks at the porous membrane between past and present while simultaneously tackling the internet as sound. This work album explores the liminal areas of the contemporary soundscape that are characterized by the presence of human voice coming from old and timeworn recordings. Like in the auditory pareidolia, the psychological phenomenon in which the mind hears indistinct voices in random noise where none exist, voices and music emerge from the everyday soundscape through the omnipresent internet connected devices, creating glitches between time and space.

Discography

Albums
 (2022) Real LP, MC, digital (Karlrecords)
 (2020) Shards of Distant Times LP, CD, digital (Karlrecords)
 (2019) No Eye Has an Equal LP, MC, digital (99chants)
 (2018) Disappearing in a Mirror LP, CD, digital (Karlrecords)
 (2017) Borders and Ruins LP, digital (Karlrecords)
 (2016) Goccia CD, digital (Home Normal)
 (2015) Spazio Sacro CD, digital (Time Released Sound)
 (2014) Aer CD, digital (Dronarivm)
 (2012) Tarsia CD, digital (Nomadic Kids Republic)

Collaborations
 (2020) Enrico Coniglio & Giulio Aldinucci Stalking the Elusive CD, digital (Dronarivm)
 (2018) Giulio Aldinucci & The Star Pillow Hidden CD, digital (Midira)
 (2018) Ian Hawgood & Giulio Aldinucci Consequence Shadows CD, digital (Home Normal)
 (2017) Francesco Giannico & Giulio Aldinucci Reframing CD, digital (Eilean)
 (2017) Giulio Aldinucci & Francis M. Gri Segmenti CD, digital (KrysaliSound)
 (2016) Francesco Giannico & Giulio Aldinucci Agoraphonia CD, digital (Dronarivm)
 (2015) Pleq & Giulio Aldinucci The Prelude To CD, digital (The Long Story Recording Company)

EPs
 (2021) Mary and the Ladder digital (Superpang)
 (2021) Music from Organ LP, digital (npm-label)
 (2018) Crystalline Tragedies / The Procession (Distant Motionless Shores) split with Martijn Comes LP, digital (Moving Furniture Records)
 (2016) Confini / Fiaccole digital (Sonospace)
 (2016) Mutus Liber split with Moon Ra cassette, digital (No Problema Tapes)
 (2015) Yellow Horse CD, digital (Manyfeetunder / Concrete)
 (2013) Archipelago cassette, digital (Other Electricities)
 (2011) Boule à Neige digital (Laverna Net Label)

Various Projects
 (2013) AIPS collective - Postcards From Italy CD, digital (Oak editions)
 (2012) Viandanti (Nostalghia paths, homage to Andrei Tarkovsky) digital (radio show for Radia network - Radio Papesse)

Obsil project Albums
 (2006) Obsil - Points CD, digital (Disasters by Choice Records)
 (2009) Obsil - Distances CD, digital (Disasters by Choice Records)
 (2011) Obsil - Vicino CD, digital (Psychonavigation Records)

See also 
List of ambient music artists

References

External links
 Giulio Aldinucci official website
 Giulio Aldinucci official SoundCloud page
 Giulio Aldinucci on Discogs

1981 births
Ambient musicians
Avant-garde composers
Italian experimental musicians
Italian classical composers
Italian male classical composers
Italian electronic musicians
Italian musicians
Living people
Postmodern composers